Darnell Sankey (born October 11, 1994) is a gridiron football linebacker for the Arlington Renegades of the XFL. He was signed by the Denver Broncos as an undrafted free agent after the 2016 NFL Draft. He played college football at Sacramento State.

Professional career

Denver Broncos
On July 26, 2016, Sankey was signed to the Denver Broncos as an undrafted free agent. He was waived on August 29, 2016.

Oakland Raiders
On September 28, 2016, Sankey was signed to the Oakland Raiders' practice squad. On October 4, he was waived but re-signed the next day, only to be released a week later.

Kansas City Chiefs
On December 5, 2016, Sankey was signed to the Kansas City Chiefs' practice squad. He was released on January 3, 2017.

Minnesota Vikings
On July 29, 2017, Sankey was signed by the Minnesota Vikings. He was waived on August 20, 2017.

Indianapolis Colts
Three days after he was cut by the Vikings, Sankey was signed by the Indianapolis Colts on August 23, 2017. He was waived on September 2, 2017 and was signed to the Colts' practice squad the next day. He was promoted to the active roster on September 16, 2017. He was waived on September 18, 2017. He was re-signed to the practice squad on September 29. He was promoted back to the active roster on October 9, 2017. He was waived again on November 15, 2017.

Baltimore Ravens
On November 29, 2017, Sankey was signed to the Baltimore Ravens' practice squad.

Indianapolis Colts (second stint)
On January 11, 2018, Sankey signed a reserve/future contract with the Colts. He was waived by the Colts on May 1, 2018.

Detroit Lions
On July 26, 2018, Sankey signed with the Detroit Lions. He was waived on September 1, 2018 and was signed to the practice squad the next day. He was released on September 5, 2018.

New Orleans Saints
On September 19, 2018, Sankey was signed to the New Orleans Saints' practice squad.

Sankey signed a reserve/future contract with the Saints on January 21, 2019. He was waived during final roster cuts on August 30, 2019.

Calgary Stampeders
Sankey signed with the Calgary Stampeders on February 10, 2020. After the CFL canceled the 2020 season due to the COVID-19 pandemic, Sankey chose to opt-out of his contract with the Stampeders on August 31, 2020. He opted back in to his contract on January 12, 2021.

Saskatchewan Roughriders
Sankey signed with the Saskatchewan Roughriders on February 8, 2022.

References

External links 
Sacramento State Hornets bio
Indianapolis Colts bio 

1994 births
Living people
Players of American football from San Jose, California
Players of Canadian football from San Jose, California
American football linebackers
Sacramento State Hornets football players
Denver Broncos players
Oakland Raiders players
Kansas City Chiefs players
Minnesota Vikings players
Indianapolis Colts players
Baltimore Ravens players
Detroit Lions players
New Orleans Saints players
Calgary Stampeders players
Saskatchewan Roughriders players